.
This is a list of media in North Bay, Ontario.

Radio

Canadore College operates a cable/internet only radio station, "Panther Radio" with the call sign CRFM.

Weatheradio

Defunct Radio Stations

TV
North Bay is home to one television station which is locally licensed, CKNY-TV. However, that station effectively acts as a satellite of Sudbury's CICI-TV as part of the CTV Northern Ontario system — the station's only direct local production is a brief local news insert which airs as part of regional newscasts produced at the Sudbury station.

The city formerly also had its own CBC Television affiliate, CHNB-TV. However, that station was acquired directly by the CBC in 2002, and became a straight analogue rebroadcaster of CBLT-DT from Toronto; the repeater would close down on July 31, 2012, due to budget cuts.

The North Bay area is not designated as a mandatory market for digital television conversion, so the majority of stations broadcast in analogue.

In 2020, Industry Canada approved applications to convert CKNY-TV and CHCH-TV-6 signals to a digital format. Just after midnight on October 30, 2020, CTV North Bay channel 10 changed its signal frequency from analogue to digital. CHCH's transmission was temporarily off-the-air due to technical difficulties in December 2020, but resumed service to the North Bay community June 9, 2022. The signal remains in analogue.

Print
The city's main newspapers are the North Bay Nugget, a daily, and the weekly North Bay Nipissing News

Outdoor
Canada's largest outdoor advertising company, Pattison Outdoor Advertising, has a local office in North Bay.

Internet
In part due to the news cutbacks at CTV Northern Ontario in the early 2000s, several web media outlets have also emerged to provide local news coverage to North Bay. These include BayToday, North Bay Nipissing News  and NBTV, and alternative media outlets such as Solvent Magazine and North Bay Scene.

References

North Bay, Ontario

Media, North Bay